The Apache is a 1928 American silent mystery film directed by Phil Rosen and starring Margaret Livingston, Warner Richmond and Don Alvarado.

The film's sets were designed by the art director Harrison Wiley.

Cast
 Margaret Livingston as Sonya 
 Warner Richmond as Gaston Laroux 
 Don Alvarado as Pierre Dumont 
 Philo McCullough as Mons. Chautard

References

Bibliography
 Munden, Kenneth White. The American Film Institute Catalog of Motion Pictures Produced in the United States, Part 1. University of California Press, 1997.

External links

1928 films
1928 mystery films
American mystery films
Films directed by Phil Rosen
American silent feature films
Columbia Pictures films
American black-and-white films
1920s English-language films
1920s American films
Silent mystery films